Dennis Novikov won the all American final, beating Ryan Harrison 6–4, 7–5

Seeds

Draw

Finals

Top half

Bottom half

References
 Main Draw
 Qualifying Draw

Cary Challenger - Singles
2015 Singles